Citizens of Earth is a role-playing video game developed by Eden Industries and published by Atlus for Microsoft Windows, PlayStation 4, PlayStation Vita, Wii U, and the Nintendo 3DS. Players take control of the newly elected Vice President of Planet Earth, who must save the Earth by recruiting citizens to fight for him. A sequel, Citizens of Space, was released in June 2019.

Gameplay 
Citizens of Earth has been described as "a giant spoof on EarthBound" in which "you must collect your constituents like Pokémon". In it, you take the role of the newly elected Vice President of Earth, who begins his first day in office facing protestors, a missing President, and a suspicious coffee shop. As the game progresses, characters are added to the party, each with a unique title and personality, like Hippie Guy and Programmer.

Enemies are strewn about the overworld map, and should the Vice President get too close, a separate battle screen will open up. He doesn't do any fighting himself, but instead gives commands to his party of up to three characters.

Reception 

Citizens of Earth holds a rating of 66/100 on review aggregate site Metacritic, indicating "mixed or average reviews". Meghan Sullivan of IGN gave the game a 6.5/10, saying "It charmed me with its blend of old-school RPG and contemporary satire, but nearly lost my vote with its sluggish pacing, irritatingly high enemy encounter rate, and crashes".

External links

References 

2015 video games
Atlus games
Crowdfunding projects
Nintendo 3DS games
Nintendo 3DS eShop games
PlayStation 4 games
PlayStation Vita games
Role-playing video games
Single-player video games
Video games developed in Canada
Wii U games
Wii U eShop games
Windows games